Bellamy Storer (August 28, 1847November 12, 1922) was an American lawyer and politician who served two terms as a U.S. Representative from Ohio from 1891 to 1895. He later served as a diplomat for the United States, serving as minister or ambassador to Belgium, Spain, and Austria.

Biography

Storer was born in Cincinnati, Ohio, the son of Bellamy Storer (1796–1875) and uncle of Nicholas Longworth. Storer attended the common schools in Cincinnati and Dixwell's private Latin school, Boston, Massachusetts. He was graduated from Harvard University in 1867 and from the law school of Cincinnati College (now University of Cincinnati College of Law) in 1869.

He was admitted to the bar in 1869 and commenced practice in Cincinnati.  He served as assistant United States attorney for the southern district of Ohio in 1869 and 1870.

Storer's wife, Maria Longworth Nichols Storer, was the founder of Rookwood Pottery located in Cincinnati, Ohio. They married in 1886. Her Cincinnati connections were a great boost to Storer's standing in the city.

Congress 
Storer was elected as a Republican to the Fifty-second and Fifty-third Congresses (March 4, 1891 – March 3, 1895). He was not a candidate for renomination in 1894, but resumed the practice of law. He was Assistant Secretary of State in 1897.

Diplomatic posts
Storer promoted William McKinley in his campaigns for governor of Ohio and president of the United States. This service was remembered in McKinley's assignment of him to be Envoy Extraordinary and Minister Plenipotentiary to Belgium from May 4, 1897, to April 11, 1899. He was later assumed the same post for Spain from April 12, 1899, to September 26, 1902. His friend Theodore Roosevelt then assigned him as the ambassador to Austria-Hungary from 1903 to March 1906.

Although Roosevelt asked Storer to intervene with the Pope regarding a cardinalate for John Ireland, Roosevelt later had second thoughts, and Storer's activity on Ireland's behalf led to his dismissal from the Austria-Hungary post. Storer converted to Roman Catholicism from Episcopal Church  in 1896.

Last years and death
Afterwards Storer resumed the practice of law. He died in Paris, France, November 12, 1922, and was interred in Le Cimetiere Neuf in Marvejols.

Notes

Sources

1847 births
1922 deaths
Harvard University alumni
Politicians from Cincinnati
Ohio lawyers
Ambassadors of the United States to Austria-Hungary
Ambassadors of the United States to Belgium
Ambassadors of the United States to Spain
United States Department of Justice lawyers
University of Cincinnati College of Law alumni
Converts to Roman Catholicism from Anglicanism
19th-century American diplomats
20th-century American diplomats
Catholics from Ohio
19th-century American lawyers
Republican Party members of the United States House of Representatives from Ohio